Martin Škacha (born 28 October 1983) is a Czech former swimmer, who specialized in freestyle events. He won a bronze medal in the 100 m freestyle (51.52) at the 2001 European Junior Swimming Championships in Valletta, Malta. Skacha is also a member of the swimming team for Kometa Brno, and is trained by head coach Ondřej Butir.

Škacha qualified for the men's 4 × 200 m freestyle relay, as a member of the Czech Republic team, at the 2004 Summer Olympics in Athens. Teaming with Michal Rubáček, Květoslav Svoboda, and Josef Horký in heat two, Skacha anchored the last 50 metres to finish the race with a split of 1:52.35, but the Czechs settled only for seventh place and thirteenth overall in a final time of 7:26.26.

References

External links
Profile – Sportovči Česká 
Profile – Mladá fronta DNES 

1983 births
Living people
Czech male freestyle swimmers
Olympic swimmers of the Czech Republic
Swimmers at the 2004 Summer Olympics
People from Polička
Sportspeople from the Pardubice Region